The Importation Act 1562 (5 Eliz. 1 c. 7) was an Act of the Parliament of England passed during the reign of Elizabeth I.

The Act banned the importation of manufactured goods (mostly those used in military equipment) from select countries. The aim of the Act was to provide a positive balance of trade and to increase domestic employment.

Notes

Acts of the Parliament of England (1485–1603)
1562 in law
1562 in England